Peretz Naftali (born Fritz Naftali, 19 March 1888 – 30 April 1961) was a Zionist activist and Israeli politician who served in several ministerial portfolios in the 1950s.

Biography
Born in Berlin in Germany, Naftali joined the Social Democratic Party in 1911. He served in the German Army between 1911 and 1912, after which he started to work as a journalist on economic affairs, returning to the army for a spell in 1917–18 to fight in World War I. In 1921, he became editor of the economics department of the Frankfurter Zeitung, a post he held until 1926, when he became head of the economic research department of a trade union. In 1921, he also published a book, How to read the Economic Section of the Newspaper, which was a bestseller.

In 1925, he had joined the Zionism movement, and in 1931 was a delegate to the Zionist Congress. He made aliyah in 1933, initially working as a lecturer at the Technion, before becoming director general of Bank Hapoalim in 1938, a post he held until 1949. Between 1941 and 1948 he served as a member of the Assembly of Representatives.

He was elected to the Knesset in 1949 on Mapai's list. After being re-elected in 1951, he was appointed Minister without Portfolio in David Ben-Gurion's government. In June 1952, he became Minister of Agriculture, a role he held until the 1955 elections, after which he reverted to being a Minister without Portfolio. In January 1959, he became Minister of Welfare, but lost his Knesset seat and place in the cabinet in the 1959 elections.

Literature
 Wirtschaftsdemokratie: Ihr Wesen, Weg und Ziel. Herausgegeben im Auftrag des Allgemeinen Deutschen Gewerkschaftsbundes von Fritz Naphtali. Berlin: Verlagsgesellschaft des Allgemeinen Deutschen Gewerkschaftsbundes, GmbH.; 1928.

References

External links
 

1888 births
1961 deaths
German economists
Jewish emigrants from Nazi Germany to Mandatory Palestine
German male journalists
20th-century German journalists
German male writers
German Army personnel of World War I
Israeli economists
Mapai politicians
Members of the Assembly of Representatives (Mandatory Palestine)
Members of the 1st Knesset (1949–1951)
Members of the 2nd Knesset (1951–1955)
Members of the 3rd Knesset (1955–1959)
Ministers of Agriculture of Israel
Journalists from Berlin